Hanna Olsen (23 June 1889 – 10 June 1990) was a Swedish fencer who competed at the 1924 and 1928 Summer Olympics. In Paris in 1924 she competed in the women's foil event, but was eliminated in the semi-finals, placing fourth in her pool. Four years later she competed in the same event, but did not win any bouts. She was born in Karlskrona and was a member of the Stockholm's Kvinnliga Fäktklubb. She was a six-time Swedish national champion in the women's individual foil, winning the title in 1918, 1919, 1923, 1925, 1926, and 1931. She died in Kristinehamn less than two weeks before her 101st birthday.

References

External links
Hanna Olsen's profile at the Swedish Olympic Committee 

1889 births
1990 deaths
Fencers at the 1924 Summer Olympics
Fencers at the 1928 Summer Olympics
Olympic fencers of Sweden
People from Karlskrona
Swedish centenarians
Swedish female foil fencers
Women centenarians
Sportspeople from Blekinge County